Anabel Medina Garrigues and Yaroslava Shvedova were the defending champions, but lost to Martina Hingis and Sania Mirza in the quarterfinals.
Hingis and Mirza went on to win their third title in a row, defeating Casey Dellacqua and Darija Jurak in the final, 6–0, 6–4.  Mirza became the top-ranked doubles player in the WTA rankings by winning the final.

Seeds

Draw

Draw

References

External links
 Draw

Family Circle Cup - Doubles
Charleston Open